Namseong Station is a station on the Seoul Subway Line 7.

Station layout

Vicinity
Exit 1: Sadang Market
Exit 2: Dongjak High School
Exit 3: Sadang Middle School, Chongshin University
Exit 4: Namseong Elementary School

Seoul Metropolitan Subway stations
Railway stations opened in 2000
Metro stations in Dongjak District